Laureano Ruiz Quevedo (born 21 October 1937) is a Spanish retired football defender and manager.

Football career
Born in Escobedo de Villafufre, Cantabria, Ruiz played for local Racing de Santander and Gimnástica de Torrelavega, ending his career at the age of 28 to become a full-time coach. At the age of 15 he had his first experiences as a manager, and often accumulated duties whilst still an active footballer; his first professional spell was with the former club in the 1967–68 season, being relegated from Segunda División.

In the following years, Ruiz worked extensively in youth football, being charged with FC Barcelona's cantera in the 70s/80s as well as the Generalitat of Catalonia's youth facilities. In the 1975–76 campaign he was in charge of the former's first team for six La Liga games, taking the place of German Hennes Weisweiler. He managed three wins – including one at the Santiago Bernabéu Stadium against Real Madrid on 30 April 1976 (2–0) – two draws and one loss during his spell, as the Catalans finished in second position; he was replaced by Rinus Michels in the summer, but continued working with the club.

Ruiz's other managerial stints with the professionals were with UP Langreo (1971–72, second level, relegation), FC Barcelona B (1976–77, division two, relegation) Celta de Vigo (1978–79, top flight, relegation) and former team Racing Santander (1979–80, second tier, 16th position).

References

External links

FC Barcelona biography 

1937 births
Living people
Spanish footballers
Footballers from Cantabria
Association football defenders
Segunda División players
Tercera División players
Racing de Santander players
Gimnástica de Torrelavega footballers
Spanish football managers
La Liga managers
Segunda División managers
Racing de Santander managers
FC Barcelona managers
FC Barcelona Atlètic managers
RC Celta de Vigo managers